Scamper may refer to:

 Scamper (horse), a ProRodeo Hall of Fame barrel racing horse
 Scamper (Transformers), a fictional character and the partner of Metroplex in the Transformers universe
 Scamper the Penguin, the namesake of American version of The Adventures of Lolo the Penguin
 Scamper, a former Cedar Point attraction in Sandusky, Ohio
 S.C.A.M.P.E.R, a creativity technique for brainstorming